Henry William Morgan (October 17, 1857 - July 28, 1938) was a professional baseball player in the Major Leagues. He was a catcher and outfielder for the 1884 Richmond Virginians and Baltimore Monumentals.

External links

Major League Baseball catchers
Major League Baseball outfielders
19th-century baseball players
Pittsburgh Alleghenys players
Baltimore Monumentals players
Richmond Virginians players
1857 births
Richmond Virginians (minor league) players
Haverhill (minor league baseball) players
1938 deaths
Baseball players from New York (state)